The Ghosts of Mendez is a Big Finish Productions audio drama based on the British science fiction television series The Tomorrow People.

Synopsis 
Homo Superior - the next stage of human evolution. Young people with super powers, dedicated to safeguarding planet Earth. From their secret laboratory deep beneath the streets of London, aided by their super-computer TIM, they watch and wait for others like themselves - and guard against threats to all mankind. They are the Tomorrow People.

In the heart of London a new art gallery is under construction using revolutionary designs by radical architect Cordelia Mendez. Georgie, an old friend of John's, has been overseeing the gallery's construction and invites him to see it. But when disaster strikes, John is forced into action to save the lives of the construction workers - dragging the Tomorrow People into far greater danger...

For John's heroics come to the attention of a reporter who has his own agenda - and some very unscrupulous acquaintances.

Can John keep the existence of the Tomorrow People a secret from the general public? And can he help a friend in need...?

Plot 
Part 1: Building Rites

Part 2: Truth or Dare

Part 3: Promethian Fire

Cast
John - Nicholas Young
Elena - Helen Goldwyn
Paul - Daniel Wilson
TIM - Philip Gilbert
Georgie - Sarah McGuiness
Mike - Jeremy James
Jack - Mark Wright
Phillips - Mark Brailsford
Mendez - Sophie Crichton
Gestalt - Mark Wright
Caine - Maggie Stables

External links
The Ghosts of Mendez product page at Big Finish archived by archive.org
The Ghosts of Mendez

British radio dramas
2002 audio plays
The Tomorrow People